Alphonse Bilung (5 June 1933 – 11 November 2022) was an Indian Roman Catholic prelate.

Bilung was born in India and was ordained to the priesthood in 1961. He served as the bishop of the Roman Catholic Diocese of Rourkela, India, from 1979 until his retirement in 2009.

References

1933 births
2022 deaths
Indian Roman Catholic bishops
Bishops appointed by Pope John Paul II